Sophie Lisa Hopkins is a British actress and model. She is best known for her role as April MacLean in the BBC Three Doctor Who spin-off Class (2016).

Early life
Hopkins was born in Singapore and grew up in the East Yorkshire Wolds, England. She attended Woldgate School and then pursued a national diploma in Performing Arts and Musical Theatre at City of York College, graduating in 2009. In 2010, she moved to London where she trained with Identity School of Acting and joined the Fourth Monkey Theatre Company.

Career
In April 2016, Hopkins was cast in the BBC Three Doctor Who spin-off Class as April MacLean. Her character April is a student at Coal Hill School, who Hopkins described as "socially awkward", but also "compassionate, kind", and sometimes "extraordinarily brave". April was advertised as the British Buffy. When Hopkins was first sent the script, she only knew that the series would be similar to Buffy the Vampire Slayer and decided to audition on that basis, unaware that it would be a Doctor Who spin off. During the production of the series Hopkins lived in Cardiff, in the same building as actress Vivian Oparah.

Also in 2016, Hopkins made her feature film debut starring in the horror-thriller Brackenmore, set in Ireland. In 2018, Hopkins reprised her role as April MacLean in six Class audio plays by Big Finish. She then appeared in Greta Bellamacina's 2019 film Hurt by Paradise. In 2020, she participated in the Trickster virtual live readings to raise money for the NHS during the COVID-19 pandemic. She then appeared in an episode of the Sky Max series Wolfe and the Hallmark Channel film Jolly Good Christmas. She has an upcoming role in the ITV series The Long Shadow.

Filmography

Film

Television

Audio

Music videos

References

External links

Living people
21st-century British actresses
Actresses from Yorkshire
People from the East Riding of Yorkshire
Year of birth missing (living people)